Nataliya Buga (born 27 April 1971 in Kamchatka Krai, Russia) is a retired Russian alpine skier who competed in the 1994 Winter Olympics, where she finished 34th in the women's super-G and 35th in the women's downhill.

External links
 sports-reference.com
 

1971 births
Living people
Russian female alpine skiers
Olympic alpine skiers of Russia
Alpine skiers at the 1994 Winter Olympics
People from Kamchatka Krai
20th-century Russian women